Low-power network (LPN) or wireless low-power network may refer to:

 Low-power personal-area network (LPPAN), a low-power wireless sensor/actuator PAN
 Low-power wide-area network (LPWAN), a low-power wireless sensor/actuator WAN

See also
 Wireless sensor network (WSN)
 Mobile wireless sensor network (MWSN)